On June 20, 2020, the Reform Party of the United States of America selected Rocky De La Fuente as its 2020 presidential candidate at its convention.

Candidates

Nominee

Other candidates

Registered presidential candidates
The following people registered to run for president in 2020 and listed their affiliation as "Reform Party", but did not necessarily run for the Reform Party nomination:

References

Reform Party of the United States of America presidential primaries
Reform